The 2020 WNBA season was the 23rd season for the Phoenix Mercury of the Women's National Basketball Association. The season tipped off on July 25, 2020, versus the Los Angeles Sparks.

During the off-season, it was announced that Talking Stick Resort Arena would be undergoing renovations and the Mercury would be forced to play their home games at Arizona Veterans Memorial Coliseum for the 2020 season.

This WNBA season will feature an all-time high 36 regular-season games. However, the plan for expanded games was put on hold on April 3, when the WNBA postponed its season due to the COVID-19 pandemic. Under a plan approved on June 15, the league is scheduled to hold a shortened 22-game regular season at IMG Academy, without fans present, starting on July 24.

The Mercury's season got off to a slow start, with the team losing its first two games.  However, a four game win streak followed and the Mercury were 4–2.  The Mercury only won two of the next seven games and were just under .500.  The team then won its next six games to secure a playoff spot.  After losing two of their last three games, they qualified for the playoffs as the fifth overall seed.

As the fifth seed, the Mercury played the Washington Mystics in the First Round of the playoffs.  The Mercury won that a nail-biter of a game 85–84, and advanced to the Second Round.  They faced off against the fourth seeded Minnesota Lynx and were defeated in another close match, 79–80 to end their season.

Transactions

WNBA Draft

Trades/Roster Changes

Roster

Game log

Regular season

|- style="background:#fcc;"
| 1
| July 25
| Los Angeles Sparks
| L 76–99
| Taurasi (16)
| Griner (9)
| Diggins-Smith (6)
| IMG Academy0
| 0–1
|- style="background:#fcc;"
| 2
| July 29
| Indiana Fever
| L 100–106
| Hartley (26)
| Tied (7)
| Tied (5)
| IMG Academy0
| 0–2
|- style="background:#bbffbb;"
| 3
| July 31
| Las Vegas Aces
| W 102–95
| Tied (22)
| Turner (9)
| Taurasi (10)
| IMG Academy0
| 1–2

|- style="background:#bbffbb;"
| 4
| August 2
| New York Liberty
| W 96–67
| Hartley (27)
| Turner (11)
| Taurasi (9)
| IMG Academy0
| 2–2
|- style="background:#bbffbb;"
| 5
| August 4
| Atlanta Dream
| W 81–74
| Taurasi (20)
| Turner (7)
| Taurasi (6)
| IMG Academy0
| 3–2
|- style="background:#bbffbb;"
| 6
| August 6
| Chicago Sky
| W 96–86
| Tied (22)
| Griner (8)
| Taurasi (6)
| IMG Academy0
| 4–2
|- style="background:#fcc;"
| 7
| August 8
| Seattle Storm
| L 68–74
| Griner (20)
| Griner (8)
| Taurasi (5)
| IMG Academy0
| 4–3
|- style="background:#bbffbb;"
| 8
| August 10
| Dallas Wings
| W 91–79
| Diggins-Smith (26)
| Griner (13)
| Diggins-Smith (7)
| IMG Academy0
| 5–3
|- style="background:#fcc;"
| 9
| August 12
| Chicago Sky
| L 71–89
| Tied (15)
| Griner (6)
| Diggins-Smith (4)
| IMG Academy0
| 5–4
|- style="background:#bbffbb;"
| 10
| August 14
| Atlanta Dream
| W 96–80
| Hartley (24)
| Griner (8)
| Hartley (5)
| IMG Academy0
| 6–4
|- style="background:#fcc;"
| 11
| August 16
| Dallas Wings
| L 89–95
| Griner (29)
| Taurasi (9)
| Hartley (6)
| IMG Academy0
| 6–5
|- style="background:#fcc;"
| 12
| August 19
| Los Angeles Sparks
| L 74–83
| Taurasi (19)
| Turner (7)
| Hartley (9)
| IMG Academy0
| 6–6
|- style="background:#fcc;"
| 13
| August 21
| Minnesota Lynx
| L 80–90
| Hartley (24)
| Turner (9)
| Hartley (5)
| IMG Academy0
| 6–7
|- style="background:#bbffbb;"
| 14
| August 23
| Washington Mystics
| W 88–87
| Taurasi (34)
| Turner (17)
| Hartley (5)
| IMG Academy0
| 7–7
|- style="background:#bbffbb;"
| 15
| August 28
| Washington Mystics
| W 94–72
| Diggins-Smith (24)
| Smith (8)
| Taurasi (7)
| IMG Academy0
| 8–7
|- style="background:#bbffbb;"
| 16
| August 30
| Minnesota Lynx
| W 83–79
| Diggins-Smith (25)
| Turner (15)
| Peddy (5)
| IMG Academy0
| 9–7

|- style="background:#bbffbb;"
| 17
| September 1
| Las Vegas Aces
| W 92–85
| Taurasi (32)
| Turner (13)
| Tied (7)
| IMG Academy0
| 10–7
|- style="background:#bbffbb;"
| 18
| September 3
| Indiana Fever
| W 105–81
| Diggins-Smith (28)
| Turner (12)
| Diggins-Smith (8)
| IMG Academy0
| 11–7
|- style="background:#bbffbb;"
| 19
| September 5
| New York Liberty
| W 83–67
| Diggins-Smith (30)
| Turner (13)
| Turner (4)
| IMG Academy0
| 12–7
|- style="background:#fcc;"
| 20
| September 7
| Connecticut Sun
| L 70–85
| Taurasi (19)
| Turner (8)
| Diggins-Smith (6)
| IMG Academy0
| 12–8
|- style="background:#bbffbb;"
| 21
| September 9
| Connecticut Sun
| W 100–95
| Diggins-Smith (33)
| Turner (21)
| Taurasi (7)
| IMG Academy0
| 13–8
|- style="background:#fcc;"
| 22
| September 11
| Seattle Storm
| L 60–83
| Walker-Kimbrough (24)
| Turner (11)
| Peddy (6)
| IMG Academy0
| 13–9

Playoffs 

|- style="background:#bbffbb;"
| 1
| September 15
| Washington Mystics
| W 85–84
| Diggins-Smith (24)
| Turner (11)
| Taurasi (6)
| IMG Academy
| 1–0

|- style="background:#fcc;"
| 1
| September 17
| Minnesota Lynx
| 79–80
| Taurasi (28)
| Turner (14)
| Taurasi (9)
| IMG Academy
| 0–1

Standings

Playoffs

Statistics

Regular season

Awards and honors

References

External links

Phoenix Mercury seasons
Phoenix Mercury
Phoenix Mercury